Amphignostis is a monotypic snout moth genus. Its only species, Amphignostis nephelocentra, is found in Mozambique. Both the genus and species were first described by Edward Meyrick in 1934.

References

Phycitinae
Moths of Africa
Monotypic moth genera